The 2019 Asian Beach Volleyball Championship was a beach volleyball event, that was held from 9 to 12 May, 2019 in Maoming, China.

Medal summary

Participating nations

Men

 (3)
 (4)
 (2)
 (3)
 (2)
 (3)
 (2)
 (2)
 (1)
 (1)
 (2)

Women

 (3)
 (4)
 (2)
 (2)
 (3)
 (1)
 (2)
 (1)
 (3)
 (1)

Men's tournament

Preliminary round

Pool A 

|}

Pool B 

|}

Pool C 

|}

Pool D 

|}

Pool E 

|}

Pool F 

|}

Pool G 

|}

Pool H 

|}

Knockout round

Women's tournament

Preliminary round

Pool A 

|}

Pool B 

|}

Pool C 

|}

Pool D 

|}

Pool E 

|}

Pool F 

|}

Knockout round

References
Men's Results
Women's Results

External links
Official website

2018
Asian Championships
Beach volleyball
Beach volleyball